Kenneth Erichsen (born 28 December 1972) is a Guatemalan badminton player. He competed in the men's singles tournament at the 1996 Summer Olympics.

References

1972 births
Living people
Guatemalan male badminton players
Olympic badminton players of Guatemala
Badminton players at the 1996 Summer Olympics
Place of birth missing (living people)